Beneficial Fraud is an upcoming South Korean television series directed by Lee Soo-hyun, and starring Chun Woo-hee and Kim Dong-wook. It is scheduled to premiere on tvN on May 29, 2023, and will air every Monday and Tuesday at 20:50 (KST).

Synopsis 
Beneficial Fraud tells the story of a man and a woman with completely different temperaments meeting and taking revenge together toward one goal.

Cast

Main 
 Chun Woo-hee as Lee Reum: a fraudster who cannot empathize.

 Kim Dong-wook as Han Moo-yeong: a lawyer with overempathy, who has the exact opposite tendency to Lee Reum.

Supporting 
 Lee Yeon as Jung Da-jeong
 Yoon Park as Go Yo-han: a probation officer who protects and observes Lee Reum.
 Park So-jin
 Kim Tae-hoon

Production

Casting 
Actor Song Duk-ho was initially confirmed to appear in the series, but he stepped down following a corruption issue related to his military service. On February 21, 2023, it was reported that actor Yoo Hee-je was being considered for took over Song Duk-ho's role.

References

External links 

 

TVN (South Korean TV channel) television dramas
Korean-language television shows
2023 South Korean television series debuts
Upcoming television series 
Television series about revenge